This is a complete list of the islands and islets of Albania. The majority of them are small in size with only two being larger than a square kilometer, Sazan and Kunë.

List of islands and islets

See also 

 Protected areas of Albania
 Geography of Albania
 Biodiversity of Albania
 Climate of Albania

References 

 

Albania, List of islands of
Islands